Getap is a village in the Artik Municipality of the Shirak Province of Armenia. The Statistical Committee of Armenia reported its population was 822 in 2010, up from 819 at the 2001 census.

Demographics
The population of the village since 1831 is as follows:

References 

Communities in Shirak Province
Populated places in Shirak Province